Season 2008-09 saw Livingston compete in the First Division. They also competed in the Challenge Cup, League Cup and the Scottish Cup.

Overview
Livingston started the season brightly with manager Roberto Landi winning manager of the month for August. However their form dipped there after and a series of managers and financial problems saw them finish seventh in the League to confirm their place in the First Division. However at the start of the next season the club went into administration and were relegated to the Scottish Third Division.

Managers
Livingston had a total of three managers over the season. They started under Roberto Landi who was sacked on 1 December after only five months in charge with Paul Hegarty being appointed as manager on 5 December. On 25 April only four months into his 18-month contract Hegarty was suspended by the club over a private matter. David Hay took over as interim manager for the last two games of the season.

Results & fixtures

Friendlies

First Division

Challenge Cup

League Cup

Scottish Cup

Statistics

Squad

|}

League table

References

Livingston
Livingston F.C. seasons